George Swain may refer to:

 George W. Swain (1824–?), senator in the Wisconsin State Senate
 George Gilbert Swain (1829–1918), American businessman and politician
 George Fillmore Swain (1857–1931), American civil engineer
 George Swain (priest) (1870–1955), Dean of Limerick
 George Swain (walker) (1919–2000), local legend from Boron, California